= Qian Xiaojun =

Chinese businessman

- Born: Qian Xiaojun; 1974 or 1975 (age 49–50)
- Known for: Founder and general manager of Beijing United Information Technology

Qian Xiaojun (born 1974/1975) is a Chinese businessman and billionaire who founded the e-commerce company Beijing United Information Technology.

Forbes lists his net worth as of April 2022 at $1.1 billion USD.
